The 1994 All-Ireland Minor Hurling Championship was the 64th staging of the All-Ireland Minor Hurling Championship since its establishment by the Gaelic Athletic Association in 1928. The championship began on 7 May 1994 and ended on 4 September 1994.

Kilkenny entered the championship as the defending champions, however, they were beaten by Galway in the All-Ireland semi-final.

On 4 September 1994, Galway won the championship following a 2-10 to 1-11 defeat of Cork in the All-Ireland final. This was their third championship title overall and their first title since 1992.

Cork's Brian O'Driscoll was the championship's top scorer with 0-26.

Results

Leinster Minor Hurling Championship

First round

Quarter-final

Semi-finals

Final

Munster Minor Hurling Championship

First round

Semi-finals

Final

Ulster Minor Hurling Championship

Semi-final

Final

All-Ireland Minor Hurling Championship

Semi-finals

Final

Championship statistics

Top scorers

Top scorer overall

Miscellaneous

 The All-Ireland semi-final between Cork and Down was their first ever meeting in the championship.

References

External links
 All-Ireland Minor Hurling Championship: Roll Of Honour

Minor
All-Ireland Minor Hurling Championship